Cebanu is a surname. Notable persons with the surname include:

 Ilie Cebanu - Moldovan footballer, son of Pavel Cebanu
 Ion Cebanu - Moldovan politician, former Minister of Youth and Sports
 Pavel Cebanu – president of Moldovan Football Federation, former footballer and football manager

See also
Cioban
Ciobanu

Occupational surnames
Romanian-language surnames